is a former Japanese football player.

Playing career
Kazuma was born in Kanagawa Prefecture on June 22, 1982. He joined the J1 League club Yokohama F. Marinos youth team in 2001. He played many matches as a center back during the first season. However he did not play in 2002. In September 2002, he moved to the J1 club Vegalta Sendai. However he did not play much and the club was relegated to the J2 League in 2004. In 2005, he moved to the Regional Leagues club Japan Soccer College. He played often as a regular player. He retired at the end of the 2008 season.

Club statistics

References

External links

1982 births
Living people
Association football people from Kanagawa Prefecture
Japanese footballers
J1 League players
J2 League players
Yokohama F. Marinos players
Vegalta Sendai players
Japan Soccer College players
Association football defenders